Hamsah Nasirildeen (born January 17, 1999) is an American football linebacker for the New York Jets of the National Football League (NFL). He played college football at Florida State.

Early life and high school
Nasirildeen grew up in Concord, North Carolina and attended Concord High School, where he played safety, linebacker, tight end and wide receiver on the football team. He first played defense as a junior and made 85 tackles, five interceptions, two forced fumbles and broke up seven passes and also caught 35 passes for 634 yards on offense. He was named a US Army All-American as a senior after making 108 tackles with three interceptions and 45 receptions for 751 yards and five touchdowns. Rated one of the best recruits in North Carolina, he initially committed to play college football at South Carolina going into his senior year, but he later flipped his commitment to Florida State.

College career
As a true freshman, Nasirildeen played in all 13 of Florida State's games and recorded 29 tackles with two passes broken up. He again played in all of the Seminoles games with five starts at safety in his sophomore season, finishing the year with a team-leading 91 tackles, an interception and two pass breakups. As a junior he recorded 101 tackles, two tackles for loss, one sack, three forced fumbles, a fumble recovery, three passes broken up and two interceptions before he suffered a leg injury against Florida.

Professional career

Nasirildeen was selected by the New York Jets in the sixth round with the 186th overall pick of the 2021 NFL Draft. He was placed on injured reserve on October 5. He was activated on November 4, 2021.

On August 30, 2022, Nasirildeen was waived by the Jets and signed to the practice squad the next day. He was promoted to the active roster on December 17.

References

External links
Florida State Seminoles bio

1999 births
Living people
People from Concord, North Carolina
Players of American football from North Carolina
American football safeties
Florida State Seminoles football players
New York Jets players